Marco Ospitalieri (born 6 April 1992) is a Belgian footballer who plays as a left back and is currently a free agent. He formerly played for FC Eindhoven and MVV Maastricht.

Career

FC Eindhoven 
Ospitalieri started his professional career at FC Eindhoven.

MVV 
On, 30 July 2013 Ospitalieri signed for MVV Maastricht.

Fortuna Sittard 
On 31 August 2015, Ospitalieri joined Fortuna Sittard in a 2 year deal.

Personal life
Ospitalieri is of Italian descent.

See also 

 List of foreign football players in the Netherlands
 2013–14 MVV Maastricht season
 2019–20 Fortuna Sittard season

References

External links
 Voetbal International profile 
 

Living people
1992 births
People from Maasmechelen
Association football midfielders
Belgian footballers
Belgian expatriate footballers
Belgian people of Italian descent
Eredivisie players
Eerste Divisie players
Belgian Third Division players
K. Patro Eisden Maasmechelen players
K.R.C. Genk players
PSV Eindhoven players
FC Eindhoven players
MVV Maastricht players
Fortuna Sittard players
Belgian expatriate sportspeople in the Netherlands
Expatriate footballers in the Netherlands
Footballers from Limburg (Belgium)